In computing, DGCA is a freeware compression utility created in 2001 by . DGCA is also a compressed archive format, the next generation of 'GCA'. DGCA has a better compression ratio than ZIP, stronger encryption and Unicode filenames. However, DGCA is not a major compression format.

See also
List of archive formats
Comparison of file archivers

External links
Tottemo Gohan

Archive formats
Data compression software